Tristan Roberts is an American politician. He represents the Windham-6 district in the Vermont House of Representatives.

References

External links 
Official website

Democratic Party members of the Vermont House of Representatives

Living people
Year of birth missing (living people)